Emanuele Padella (born 24 September 1988) is an Italian professional footballer who plays as a defender for  club Mantova.

Club career
On 10 August 2011, he joined Grosseto on a co-ownership deal.

On 13 August 2013, he was signed by Virtus Entella.

On 11 July 2019, he signed a 2-year contract with Serie C club Vicenza.

On 19 January 2023, Padella moved to Mantova.

References

Living people
1988 births
Footballers from Rome
Association football defenders
Italian footballers
Atletico Roma F.C. players
A.C. Prato players
F.C. Grosseto S.S.D. players
Virtus Entella players
Benevento Calcio players
Ascoli Calcio 1898 F.C. players
L.R. Vicenza players
Mantova 1911 players
Serie B players
Serie C players